Martin Redlicki (born August 24, 1995) is an American tennis player of Polish descent.

Juniors

Redlicki along with Kamil Majchrzak won the 2013 US Open boys' doubles title after defeating Quentin Halys and Frederico Ferreira Silva 6–3, 6–4 in the final. Redlicki has a career high ATP singles ranking of 381 as of April 29, 2019, and a career high ATP doubles ranking of 187 achieved on November 25, 2019.

Junior Grand Slam finals

Finals: 1 (1 title)

Professional career

Redlicki made his ATP main draw debut at the 2014 Sony Open Tennis in the doubles event, where he partnered Deiton Baughman, losing in the first round to Ryan Harrison and Jack Sock, 7–5, 6–4.

For the 2016 season, he played for the Pac-12 Conference men's tennis champions UCLA Bruins and teamed with teammate Mackenzie McDonald to win the doubles individual championship at the NCAA Men's Tennis Championship. They defeated the team of Arthur Rinderknech and Jackson Withrow from the University of Texas A&M 6–4, 6–1.

Redlicki was again a winner in the NCAA doubles championship in 2018. He and partner Evan Zhu defeated Martin Joyce and Mikael Torpegaard of Ohio State, 6–7(8), 7–6(4), 11–9, for the title on May 28, 2018. Redlicki was a semifinalist in both singles and doubles. He became the third Bruin to have won two doubles championships in UCLA history.

Redlicki has an older brother who also plays tennis, Michael.

ATP Challenger and ITF Futures finals

Singles: 4 (1–3)

Doubles: 15 (9–6)

References

External links
 
 

1995 births
Living people
American male tennis players
US Open (tennis) junior champions
UCLA Bruins men's tennis players
American people of Polish descent
People from Hawthorn Woods, Illinois
Grand Slam (tennis) champions in boys' doubles
Tennis people from Illinois